Recirculating ball, also known as recirculating ball and nut or worm and sector, is a steering mechanism commonly found in older automobiles, off-road vehicles, and some trucks.  Most newer cars use the more economical rack and pinion steering instead, but some upmarket manufacturers (such as BMW and Mercedes-Benz) held on to the design until well into the 1990s for the durability and strength inherent in the design. A few, including Chrysler, General Motors and Lada, still use this technology in certain models including the Jeep Wrangler and the Lada Niva.

Mechanism
The recirculating ball steering mechanism contains a worm gear inside a block with a threaded hole in it; this block has gear teeth cut into the outside to engage the sector shaft (also called a sector gear) which moves the Pitman arm.  The steering wheel connects to a shaft, which rotates the worm gear inside of the block.  Instead of twisting further into the block, the worm gear is fixed so that when it rotates, it moves the block, which transmits the motion through the gear to the Pitman arm, causing the roadwheels to turn.

Bearing balls
The worm gear is similar in design to a ball screw; the threads are filled with steel balls that recirculate through the gear and rack as it turns.  The balls serve to reduce friction and wear in the gear, and reduce slop.  Slop, when the gears come out of contact with each other, would be felt when changing the direction of the steering wheel, causing the wheel to feel loose.

Power assistance
Power steering in a recirculating-ball system works similarly to that in a rack-and-pinion system. Assistance is provided by supplying higher-pressure fluid to one side of the block.

See also
Burman and Sons Ltd - defunct manufacturer of recirculating ball steering gear

References

Mechanisms (engineering)
Automotive steering technologies